The Latins were originally an Italic tribe in ancient central Italy from Latium. As Roman power and colonization spread Latin culture during the Roman Republic. 
Latins culturally "Romanized" or "Latinized" the rest of Italy, and the word Latin ceased to mean a particular people or ethnicity, acquiring a more legal and cultural sense. As the Roman Empire spread to include Spain, Portugal, France, and Romania, these joined Italy in becoming "Latin" and remain so to the present day.
In the 15th and 16th centuries, Portugal, Spain and France began to build world empires in the Americas, Africa and the East Indies. By the mid-19th century, the former American colonies of these Latin European nations became known as Latin America.

Antiquity

The Latins were an ancient Italic people of the Latium region in central Italy (Latium Vetus, "Old Latium"), in the 1st millennium BC. Although they lived in independent city-states, they spoke a common language (Latin), held common religious beliefs, and shared a sense of kinship, expressed in the myth that all Latins descend from Latinus. Latinus was worshiped on Mons Albanus (Monte Albano) during an annual festival attended by all Latins, including those from Rome, one of the Latin states. The Latin cities extended common rights of residence and trade to one another.

Rome's territorial ambitions united the rest of the Latins, the Latin League as they were later called, against Rome in the Latin War in 341 BC, but in the end Rome won in 338 BC. Consequently, some of the Latin states were incorporated within the Roman state, and their inhabitants were given full Roman citizenship. Others became Roman allies and enjoyed certain privileges.

Middle Ages

After the fall of the Western Roman Empire, many Europeans held on to the "Latin" identity, more specifically, in the sense of the Romans, as members of the Empire.

In the Eastern Roman Empire, and the broader Greek-Orthodox world, Latins was a synonym for all people who followed Roman Catholic Christianity. It was generally a negative characterization, especially after the 1054 schism. Latins is still used by the Orthodox church communities, but only in a theological context.

The Holy Roman Empire was founded centuries after the fall of Rome but brandished the name of the Roman people and honoured the king with the title "King of the Romans". Despite this, the Holy Roman Empire was largely an affair with Roman-German kings, although its territory was considerably greater than present-day Germany.

Modern uses

Latin Europe

The term Latin Europe is used in reference to European nations where Italians, French, Portuguese, Romanians and Spaniards live. Their cultures are particularly Roman-derived. They include the use of Romance languages and the traditional predominance of Western Christianity (especially Roman Catholicism).  Strong Roman legal and cultural traditions characterize these nations. Latin Europe is a major subdivision of Europe, along with Germanic Europe and Slavic Europe.

Latin America

Of all world regions, the Americas have been most significantly influenced by Latin European countries in regards to culture, language, religion, and genetic contribution to the population. The Latin European-influenced region of the Americas came to be called Latin America in the 19th century. The term is usually used to refer to Spanish- and Portuguese-speaking countries, namely Hispanic America and Brazil.

Lazio
The Central Italian region, the birthplace of Latin Civilization, still preserves its Latin identity in the modern name Lazio (Ancient Latium).

Latin Valley

A region in Lazio corresponding to the eastern area of ancient Roman Latium (Southern Province of Rome and Province of Frosinone).

See also 
 Latin Rights
 Latin Valley
 Latin Union

References

External links
Distinguishing the terms: Latins and Romans

Latin language
Modern Indo-European peoples